William Cross (10 September 1850 - 16 October 1890) was a Scotland international rugby union player.

Rugby Union career

Amateur career

Cross played for Glasgow Academicals, and Merchistonians.

Provincial career

He played in the world's first provincial district match in 1872; the 'inter-city' - a match between Glasgow District and Edinburgh District. Cross played for Glasgow as a half-back.

International career

Cross was one of the first international half-backs, along with J.W. Arthur and their English counterparts.

Cross represented Scotland in 1871 in the first international match. Of the Scottish score, one of the English players wrote: "after a maul, just outside the English goal-line the umpires ordered the ball to be put down in the scrummage five yards outside the line. It was taken was out accordingly, but, instead of putting it down, the Scottish forwards drove the entire scrummage into goal, and then grounded the ball and claimed a try. This, though illegal according to English laws, was allowed by the umpires and the goal was kicked by Cross."

At the time, conversions and goals, not tries produced a score, so in fact Cross, not Buchanan was the first to put points on the board. In fact, this was the only score in the match.

Cross rounded off the game with a second try, ninety seconds before the final whistle, when with their forwards running riot, J.W. Arthur knocked on from a line-out and the ball looped over the English defenders, with the quick thinking Cross picking it up for Scotland's second try.

He played one more international in 1872.

Referee career

After his international playing career was over, Cross became Scotland's second international rugby referee when he officiated an early encounter between Scotland and England. This was his only international game as a referee.

He refereed the 1882 inter-city match between Glasgow District and Edinburgh District.

Administrative career

Cross took up a role within the Scottish Rugby Union and he continued promoting Scottish rugby, becoming President of the Scottish Rugby Union for the 1882-83 season.

Family

His brother Malcolm Cross gained nine caps for Scotland.

References

Sources 

 Bath, Richard (ed.) The Scotland Rugby Miscellany (Vision Sports Publishing Ltd, 2007 )
 Massie, Allan A Portrait of Scottish Rugby (Edinburgh: Polygon, 1985 )

1850 births
1890 deaths
Merchistonian FC players
Glasgow District (rugby union) players
History of rugby union in Scotland
Presidents of the Scottish Rugby Union
Rugby union players from Bridgend
Scotland international rugby union players
Scottish Districts referees
Scottish rugby union players
Scottish rugby union referees